Coenobia  is a genus of moths of the family Noctuidae.

Species
 Coenobia orientalis Sugi, 1982
 Coenobia rufa (Haworth, 1809)

References
 Coenobia at Markku Savela's Lepidoptera and Some Other Life Forms
 Natural History Museum Lepidoptera genus database

Hadeninae